Paul Muralt is a mechanical engineer from the Swiss Federal Institute of Technology in Lausanne, Switzerland. He was named a Fellow of the Institute of Electrical and Electronics Engineers (IEEE) in 2013 for his contributions to piezoelectric microelectromechanical systems.

References

Fellow Members of the IEEE
Living people
Swiss engineers
Year of birth missing (living people)
Place of birth missing (living people)